The Cathedral of Saint Andrew in Little Rock, Arkansas, United States, is a historic church and the oldest place of continuing worship in the city.  It is the seat of the Roman Catholic Diocese of Little Rock.  The property is located at the corner of South Louisiana Street and West 7th Street in downtown Little Rock.

History
The Rev. Peter Donnelly from the Diocese of St. Louis celebrated the first Mass in Little Rock in a room over Dugan's Store at 2nd and Main Streets in 1830.  As the congregation grew they acquired a building for their use on East Markham near Third Street.  The Rev. Joseph Richard Bole and Father Paris were sent to Little Rock to build a permanent church building in 1839 on the property where the Arcade Building was located on Louisiana between Sixth and Seventh Streets.  Known as the Old French Church, it was dedicated by Bishop Mathias Loras of the Diocese of Dubuque, Iowa in 1841.  The Diocese of Little Rock was established by Pope Gregory XVI on November 28, 1843, with the Most Rev. Andrew Byrne as the first bishop.

Bishop Byrne established the first St. Andrew's Cathedral at Second and Center Streets in 1845.  As the congregation grew a new cathedral was needed.  The cornerstone for the present cathedral was laid by Bishop Edward Fitzgerald on July 7, 1878.  The church was dedicated on November 27, 1881.  It was designed by Little Rock architect Thomas Harding and cost $470,000 to build.  The tallest tower on the façade of the building was completed in 1887.

A tornado struck downtown Little Rock in 1950 and toppled the cross on top of the tower.  It also destroyed two of the stained glass windows.  The present rectory was built in 1966.  St. Andrew's Cathedral was listed on the National Register of Historic Places in 1986.

Architecture
The Cathedral of St. Andrew is a Gothic Revival style structure that was built of native granite. The interior is finished in Southern yellow pine and features a marble high altar that is decorated with onyx and other precious stones.

See also
List of Catholic cathedrals in the United States
List of cathedrals in the United States
National Register of Historic Places listings in Little Rock, Arkansas

References

External links 

 Official Cathedral Site
 Roman Catholic Diocese of Little Rock Official Site

Religious organizations established in 1845
Roman Catholic churches completed in 1881
Churches in Little Rock, Arkansas
Andrew, Little Rock
Churches in the Roman Catholic Diocese of Little Rock
Gothic Revival church buildings in Arkansas
Churches on the National Register of Historic Places in Arkansas
National Register of Historic Places in Little Rock, Arkansas
1845 establishments in Arkansas
19th-century Roman Catholic church buildings in the United States